Carl A. "Eggs" Eggebrecht (November 9, 1893 – July 1, 1958) was an American football and basketball coach and college athletics administrator. He served as the head football coach at Lombard College in Galesburg, Illinois in 1920, Heidelberg College—now known as Heidelberg University—in Tiffin, Ohio from 1921 to 1923, Central State Teachers College—now known as the University of Wisconsin–Stevens Point—in Stevens Point, Wisconsin from 1927 to 1928, and Midland College—now known as Midland University—in Fremont, Nebraska from 1935 to 1936, compiling a career college football coaching record of 25–28–5.

Early life and playing career
Eggebrecht was born on November 9, 1893, in Wausau, Wisconsin. There he graduated from Wausau High School, where he was a member of the football, basketball, and track teams.

Eggebrecht first attended college at Beloit College in Beloit, Wisconsin, where he played football and basketball. He then moved on to River Falls Normal School—now known as University of Wisconsin–River Falls—where he was a member of the varsity football and basketball teams before graduating in 1916. He played for the football team in the fall of 1915 and the basketball team that winter. Both squads won the Inter-Normal Athletic Conference of Wisconsin title in their respective sports.

Eggebrecht spent the 1916–17 academic year as the principal of a grade school in Chippewa Falls, Wisconsin. He resigned from that position in 1917 to attend Springfield College in Springfield, Massachusetts. Eggebrecht played as a fullback on Springfield's football team that fall. He also played as a center on Springfield’s basketball team and was elected as team captain for the 1918–19 season.

Coaching career
Eggebrecht began his coaching career at the college level in 1920, when we was hired as physical director and athletic coach at Lombard College in Galesburg, Illinois.

Eggebrecht moved to Marshall High School in Minneapolis, Minnesota in 1924, where he coached football and baseball for three seasons and basketball for two. He resigned from his post as Marshall High School in the summer of 1927 and was hired as coach and athletic director at Stevens Point Normal School—now known as the University of Wisconsin–Stevens Point. In June 1935, Eggebrecht was appointed the athletic director at Midland College—now known as Midland University—in Fremont, Nebraska.

Late life and death
Eggebrecht later worked as an automobile dealer in Wausau. He died on July 1, 1958, at a hospital in Madison, Wisconsin.

Head coaching record

College football

References

External links
 

1893 births
1958 deaths
American football fullbacks
Centers (basketball)
Beloit Buccaneers football players
Beloit Buccaneers men's basketball players
Heidelberg Student Princes athletic directors
Heidelberg Student Princes football coaches
Heidelberg Student Princes men's basketball coaches
Lombard Olive baseball coaches
Lombard Olive football coaches
Midland Warriors athletic directors
Midland Warriors football coaches
Midland Warriors men's basketball coaches
Springfield Pride football players
Springfield Pride men's basketball players
Wisconsin–River Falls Falcons football players
Wisconsin–River Falls Falcons men's basketball players
Wisconsin–Stevens Point Pointers athletic directors
Wisconsin–Stevens Point Pointers football coaches
Wisconsin–Stevens Point Pointers men's basketball coaches
High school baseball coaches in the United States
High school basketball coaches in Minnesota
High school football coaches in Minnesota
Sportspeople from Wausau, Wisconsin
Coaches of American football from Wisconsin
Players of American football from Wisconsin
Baseball coaches from Wisconsin
Basketball coaches from Wisconsin
Basketball players from Wisconsin